A Shot in the West is a 2006 low budget Western short film shot in the rundown council estate of Drumchapel, Glasgow. The film was written, directed and edited by three friends (Justin Burns, Bob Kelly and John Maguire). All sound and camera equipment was borrowed from a local community group. Many interior shots were filmed at a local public house, where the crew were allowed to take over the function suite for two and a half days. Catering was supplied by a local bakery. Costumes were either borrowed or provided by the cast.

Once most elements were in place producer/director Bob Kelly approached actor David Hayman to ask for advice. However, David was so impressed by Bob's enthusiasm and progress he offered to star in the movie. On the same day Zal Cleminson and Chris Glen from The Sensational Alex Harvey Band were with David Hayman. Being musicians they asked about the soundtrack. Bob informed them the soundtrack would be created by another friend, Stephen Maguire. They offered to help and a meeting and jam session with Stephen was set up. Stephen and The Sensational Alex Harvey Band got on well, so agreed to work on the soundtrack together.

Plot
The film follows a lonesome desperado known only as "Gold Bullet" as he arrives in a small western town 'Last Valley' populated by thugs, rogues, gunslingers and businessmen. "Gold Bullet" is in town for one reason only, to collect a debt owed to him by a former employer Henry Wynn. Will Wynn give up the money or will it all end in bloodshed?

Cast
 Alexander Watson ... Gold Bullet
 Zal Cleminson ... Wilson
 David Hayman ... Henry Wynn
 Ewan Black ... Borrachonne
 Robert Kelly ... Gunslinger #1
 Duncan Wilson ... Gunslinger #2
 Harry Garrity ... Town Drunk

Soundtrack
 A Couple Pieces of Silver - Stephen Maguire and The Sensational Alex Harvey Band
 Dressed to Kill - Alexander Watson and The Sensational Alex Harvey Band

External links
 
 
 Evening Times article
 Financial Times article
 An article from The Herald

2006 films
British short films
2006 Western (genre) films
2000s English-language films